The 27th General Assembly of Prince Edward Island was in session from March 15, 1877, to March 12, 1879. The first government formed was a Protestant coalition led by Louis Henry Davies. After the coalition failed, the Conservative Party led by William Wilfred Sullivan formed a government.

There were three sessions of the 27th General Assembly:

Henry Beer was elected speaker.

Members

Notes:

External links
  Election results for the Prince Edward Island Legislative Assembly, 1876-08-10
 Prince Edward Island, garden province of Canada, WH Crosskill (1904)

Terms of the General Assembly of Prince Edward Island
1877 establishments in Prince Edward Island
1879 disestablishments in Prince Edward Island